The 2005 Bangkok International Film Festival started on January 13 and ran until January 24. The Golden Kinnaree Awards were announced on January 21.

Awards

Golden Kinnaree International Competition 
 Best Film: The Sea Inside (Mar adentro), directed by Alejandro Amenábar, Spain
 Being Julia, directed by István Szabó, Canada/United States/Hungary/UK
 Clean, directed by Olivier Assayas, France/UK
 Don’t Move (Non ti muovere), directed by Sergio Castellitto, Italy
 Les Choristes, directed by Christophe Barratier, France/Switzerland
 Innocent Voices (Voces innocents), directed by Luis Mandoki, Mexico
 The Motorcycle Diaries (Diarios de motocicleta), directed by Walter Salles, Argentina/UK/USAGermany/Peru
 Old Boy, directed by Park Chan-Wook, South Korea
 Red Dust, directed by Tom Hooper, South Africa/UK (Opening Night film)
 Shutter, directed by Pakpoom Wongpoom and Banjong Pisanthanakun, Thailand
 The Syrian Bride, directed by Eran Riklis, France/Germany/Israel
 Vera Drake, directed by Mike Leigh, UK
 Želary, directed by Ondřej Trojan, Czech Republic
 Best Director (tie):
Christophe Barratier (Les Choristes, France/Switzerland)
Park Chan-Wook (Old Boy, South Korea)
 Best Actor: Javier Bardem (The Sea Inside, Spain)
 Best Actress (tie):
Annette Bening (Being Julia, Canada, UK)
Ana Geislerova (Zelary, Czech Republic)
 Lifetime Achievement Award: Vichit Kounavudhi (Thailand)

ASEAN Competition 
 Best ASEAN Film: The Beautiful Washing Machine, directed by James Lee, Malaysia
 The Buffalo Boy (Mua Len Trau), directed by Minh Nguyen-Vo, Vietnam
 Crying Ladies, directed by Mark Meily, Philippines
 Homecoming, directed by Gil Portes, Philippines
 The Judgement (Ai-Fak), directed by Patham Thonsang, Thailand 
 Keka, directed by Quark Henares, Philippines
 The Letter, directed by Phaoon Chandrasiri, Thailand
 Perth, directed by Djinn, Singapore
 Pisaj, directed by Chookiat Sakvirakul, Thailand
 Princess of Mount Ledang (Puteri Gunung Ledang), directed by Saw Teong Hin, Malaysia 
 Rainmaker, directed by Ravi Bharwani, Indonesia
 Sagai United, directed by Somching Srisuphab, Thailand
 Spirits, directed by Victor Vu, Vietnam
 True Love, directed by Kyi Soe Tun, Burma
 Women of Breakwater, directed by Mario O'Hara, Philippines

 Short films and documentaries 
 Jameson's Best Asian Short Film Award: Birthday (Bertrand Lee, Singapore)
 Special Mentions:Gay Or Not (Wai Yee Chan, Yee Nam Lou, Hong Kong)Little Terrorist (Ashvin Kumar, India)Down the River (Anucha Boonyawatana, Thailand)Cut (Royston Tan, Singapore)
 Best Documentary: Born Into Brothels (USA/UK)
 Special Mentions:Touch The Sound - for giving inspiration through sound and artistic treatmentFinal Solution - for the courage of reflecting realities
 New Voices Award: Bharatbala'' (Hari Om, India)

External links 
2005 BKKIFF's official website

2005
2005 in Thailand
2005 film festivals
2005 festivals in Asia
2005 in Bangkok